Jared Turner (born 12 April 1978) is a New Zealand-born Australian actor, best known for his roles as Ben Maddox in Go Girls and as Ty Johnson on the television series, The Almighty Johnsons. He is also recognised on New Zealand TV screens for hosting the energy saving adverts, "Energy Spot".

Early life
Turner was born in New Plymouth, Taranaki, New Zealand to parents of Samoan and German descent. His family moved to Sydney, Australia in 1980 and he went on to graduate from Theatre Nepean, University of Western Sydney in 2000.

Personal life
In 2014, Turner married costume designer Lissy Mayer at a wedding ceremony in Oratia, New Zealand. The couple has a blended family of four children.

Filmography

Film

Television

Theatre

External links

References

1978 births
Living people
Actors of Samoan descent
Australian people of Samoan descent
Australian people of German descent
New Zealand people of Samoan descent
New Zealand people of German descent
New Zealand male film actors
New Zealand male television actors
Western Sydney University alumni
People from New Plymouth